"Welcome to New York" is a song by American singer-songwriter Taylor Swift, taken from her fifth studio album, 1989 (2014). The song was written and produced by both Swift and Ryan Tedder, with additional production from Noel Zancanella. It was released on October 20, 2014, as a promotional single for the album, through Big Machine Records. A synth-pop, disco, and electropop song equipped with pulsating synthesizers, it explores Swift's newfound freedom, inspired by her relocation to New York City in March 2014.

Contemporary music critics criticized the lyrics, arguing that the song lacks substance compared to popular New York tribute songs. A number of others defended the song, noting its mention of LGBT equality, and praised the production. The song reached the top 10 in New Zealand, and entered the top 20 of the charts in Canada, Hungary, and Scotland. In the United States, "Welcome to New York" reached number 48 on the Billboard Hot 100 and was certified platinum by the Recording Industry Association of America (RIAA). Swift donated all proceeds from the sales to the New York City Department of Education.

Background and development 
Inspired by 1980s synth-pop with synthesizers, drum pads, and overlapped vocals, Taylor Swift decided to move away from the signature country styles of her previous releases and incorporate straightforward pop production for her fifth studio album 1989, which was released in 2014. The recording process began in mid-2013 concurrently with the start of Swift's the Red Tour in support of her fourth studio album Red (2012).

Swift recalled that her relocation to New York City in March 2014 served as an inspiration for 1989s conception, saying: "I was so intimidated by this city for so long ... I thought I would never be able to make it here, because I wasn't something enough — bold enough, brave enough to take on this huge city in all of its blaring honesty. And then at a certain point I just thought, 'I'm ready.'" She said that the city's energy prompted her to embark on "endless potential and possibilities". To this end, she actively sought to collaborate with new producers, including Ryan Tedder. Tedder was contacted by Swift via a Voice Memo, and produced two tracks for 1989: "Welcome to New York" and "I Know Places".

Production and composition

Swift wrote the song's lyrics before approaching Tedder to produce a 1980s sound. Tedder programmed the song with a Roland Juno-106 synthesizer and finished the first demo within three hours. He produced four different versions of the song, but Swift chose the one closest to the first demo as the final version. According to the album's booklet, the producers of the song were Tedder, Noel Zancanella, and Swift. "Welcome to New York" was recorded by Tedder and Smith Carison at Conway Recording Studios in Los Angeles, California. It was mixed by Serban Ghenea at MixStar Studios in Virginia Beach, Virginia; and mastered by Tom Coyne at Sterling Sound Studios in New York City.

"Welcome to New York" is the opening track of 1989. It is a bright synth-pop and electropop song, instrumented by pulsating synthesizers, clapping rhythms, programmed drums, and multitracked vocals. It has a length of three minutes and thirty-two seconds (3:32). The song's pulsing synth production sets the overall tone of 1989 synth-pop sound. Rob Sheffield of Rolling Stone described it as a disco track. Its lyrics are about Swift's feelings when she first moved into New York City, and find her embracing a newfound sense of freedom. Swift sings in a lighthearted manner, "Everybody here was someone else before." The lyrics "We first dropped our bags on apartment floors / Took our broken hearts, put them in a drawer" show that Swift no longer dramatized failed relationships, a departure from her usual themes. Several publications viewed the lyrics "And you can want who you want / Boys and boys and girls and girls" as Swift's way of supporting LGBT equality.

Critical reception
Music critics received "Welcome to New York" with mixed reviews, finding it lacking substance compared to other popular New York tribute songs and subpar for Swift's artistry. Esther Zuckerman of Entertainment Weekly wrote, "It honors the city... but only skims the surface." Jon Caramanica from The New York Times called the lyrics "slightly dim" and deemed the song one of 1989 weakest. In response to the criticism, Swift said that she was trying to capture a "momentary emotion", which she believed to be crucial to her role as a songwriter. In retrospective reviews, Parade's Samuel R. Murrian and Spin's Al Shipley picked "Welcome to New York" one of 1989's weakest tracks.

Robert Christgau, in a review published on Cuepoint, felt that critics had been too harsh so as to not appear to be fans of Swift. He said, "I think it's silly to demand sociology from someone who can't stroll Central Park without bodyguards", and defended Swift's perspectives given her upper middle class background as opposed to the majority of the middle class in New York City. On a more positive note, Daniel D'Addario of Time magazine stated that the song was a "new kind of equality anthem". D'Addario felt that the song's lighthearted production and the lyrics "You can want who you want / Boys and boys and girls and girls" effectively promoted sexual equality, albeit in a rather nuanced way. Jason Lipshutz of Billboard praised the song's synth production, but felt that the lyrics were a step down from Swift's traditional vivid songwriting.

Several critics viewed that the song's lighthearted theme and production set the tone effectively for 1989. Consequence of Sound reviewer Sasha Geffen considered the lyrics exemplary of Swift's new carefree attitude, and opined that the song is not about New York City itself, but about "New York City the idea — an aspirational playground always situated slightly out of reach". Nate Scott of USA Today defended the song's theme, which others might denounce as a "tired cliché", writing: "She just lived it: She moved to New York, and she felt her life was changed by moving to the big city." PopMatters reviewer Corey Baesley acknowledged that the song itself might sound bland, but applauded it as an effective opener to the album because "it's a manifesto, not an overture". Spin magazine's Andrew Unterberger similarly praised the song as a showcase of Swift's artistic maturity, and Marah Eakin of The A.V. Club selected it as one of 1989 better songs. Lucy Harbron of Clash praised the song's production and theme in a retrospective review.

Release and commercial performance

"Welcome to New York" was released for digital download via the iTunes Store on October 20, 2014, as one of 1989 pre-release promotional singles. Prior to the digital release, Swift shared a 30-second sample of the song on YouTube. In the United States, the song peaked at number 48 on the Billboard Hot 100. The song was later certified platinum by the Recording Industry Association of America (RIAA) for selling 1,000,000 units in the United States.

The song was a top ten hit in New Zealand, peaking at number six on the New Zealand Singles Chart. It managed to reach the top 40 on the record charts of several countries, including Hungary (16), Scotland (16), Canada (19), Spain (21), Australia (23), Denmark (27), and the United Kingdom (39). Swift donated all proceeds from the sales of "Welcome to New York" to the New York City Department of Education.

Live performances and other usage

Swift was named an official tourism ambassador for New York City on October 27, 2014; later that same day, she performed "Welcome to New York" during the 1989 Secret Sessions, live streamed by Yahoo! and iHeartRadio from Manhattan. As part of the promotion of 1989, Swift performed "Welcome to New York" on various televised shows, including Late Show with David Letterman and Good Morning America. The song served as the opener for the 1989 World Tour, on which Swift embarked to support 1989 throughout 2015.

Ryan Adams recorded an acoustic version of "Welcome to New York" for his track-by-track cover of Swift's 1989. His version incorporates acoustic guitar and, in the words of The A.V. Club Annie Zaleski, "clenched-teeth vocal delivery and salt-of-the-earth strums". Dan Caffrey from Consequence of Sound picked "Welcome to New York" as one of the best songs on Adams's 1989.

Credits and personnel
Credits are adapted from the liner notes of 1989.

Taylor Swift – vocals, writer, producer
Ryan Tedder – producer, recording, writer, background vocals, piano, juno
Noel Zancanella – producer, drum programming, synthesizer
Smith Carlson – recording
Eric Eylands – assistant recording
Matthew Tryba – assistant recording
Serban Ghenea – mixing
John Hanes – engineered for mix
Tom Coyne – mastering

Charts

Certifications

References 

2014 songs
Taylor Swift songs
Ryan Adams songs
Song recordings produced by Taylor Swift
Song recordings produced by Noel Zancanella
Song recordings produced by Ryan Tedder
Songs written by Ryan Tedder
Songs written by Taylor Swift
Songs about New York City
American synth-pop songs
LGBT-related songs